General elections were held in Denmark on 10 May 1988, just seven months after the last elections. Prime Minister Poul Schlüter chose to call for an election after the Conservative People's Party-led government fell short of a majority in a foreign policy issue after they failed to come to an agreement with the Social Democrats. In a parliamentary debate, Prime Minister Poul Schlüter accused Svend Auken (the leader of the Social Democrats) of breaking a political deal between the two of them whilst Auken accused Schlüter of lying to the public.

However, the election did not change the balance of power in the Folketing. Common Course failed to cross the 2% percent threshold and lost their four seats. The Centre Democrats and the Christian People's Party left the government (although they continued to support it) and were replaced by the Danish Social Liberal Party. The reason for doing this was that it gave Schlüter a majority in foreign policy issues which had caused this election. Nonetheless, the Centre Democrats and the Christian People's Party continued to support the government.

Voter turnout was 86% in Denmark proper, 70% in the Faroe Islands and 58% in Greenland.

Results

See also
List of members of the Folketing, 1988–1990

References

Further reading
Jespersen, Mary P. S. "A Danish Defence Dilemma: The Election of May 1988," West European Politics (1989) 12#1 pp. 189–195.

Elections in Denmark
Denmark
1988 elections in Denmark
May 1988 events in Europe